Lieutenant General Sir James Hills-Johnes,  (20 August 1833 – 3 January 1919) was a British Indian Army officer and a recipient of the Victoria Cross, the highest award for gallantry in the face of the enemy that can be awarded to British and Commonwealth forces.

Early life
Born James Hills on 20 August 1833 in Neechindipur, Bengal, India, he was the son of James and Charlotte Hills. He was educated at the Edinburgh Academy (1843–1847), the Edinburgh Institution (1847–1850) and the Addiscombe Military Seminary (1851–1853), and was commissioned into the Bengal Artillery in 1853. Hills changed his surname to Hills-Johnes in 1882 on his marriage to Elizabeth Johnes, the younger daughter and coheiress of John Johnes of Dolaucothi, Carmarthenshire.

Military career

Hills was a 23 years old second lieutenant in the Bengal Horse Artillery during the Indian Mutiny when the following deed took place at the Siege of Delhi on 9 July 1857 for which he and Henry Tombs were awarded the Victoria Cross:

In addition to the Delhi clasp of the Indian Mutiny Medal, Hills received the Lucknow clasp awarded to troops under command of Sir Colin Campbell who were engaged in final operations leading to the surrender of Lucknow and the clearing of the surrounding areas from November 1857 to March 1858. 

After a number of staff appointments, Hills served as an artillery officer in the Abyssinian campaign of 1867–68 and the Lushai Expedition of 1871–72. Promoted major-general in July 1879, he fought in the Second Anglo-Afghan War (1878–80), and was made military governor of Kabul in October 1879 and commanded a division in 1880. For services in Afghanistan he was appointed Knight Commander of the Order of the Bath (KCB) in March 1881. Hills-Johnes was promoted lieutenant-general in January 1884 and retired in 1888. He was made a Knight Grand Cross of the Order of the Bath (GCB) in June 1893.

Later life

Hills-Johnes was High Sheriff of Carmarthenshire in 1886 and made an honorary freeman of the town of Carmarthen in 1910. He also served as a member of Carmarthenshire County Council. He was appointed Honorary Colonel of the Royal Carmarthen Artillery, the local Militia unit, on 25 February 1891. He was a long standing friend of Lord Roberts, and in 1900 he accompanied Roberts in a private capacity during the South African War. 

He died of influenza during the post-war pandemic on 3 January 1919, aged 85, at his Dolaucothi Estate and was buried at Caio, Carmarthenshire.

Hills-Johnes had five brothers and four sisters. The brothers included Major-General Sir John Hills (1834–1902) of the Bombay Engineers; Robert Hills (1837–1909), a first-class cricketer who was the brother-in-law of Lieutenant William George Cubitt VC and uncle of Brigadier Lewis Pugh Evans VC; and Charles Hills (1847–1935), the family history saying he was the real father of Hollywood actress Merle Oberon.

His medals, including the Victoria Cross, are displayed at the Royal Artillery Museum, Woolwich, London.

References

Further reading
 (includes details of Sir James Hills-Johnes)

1833 births
1919 deaths
British recipients of the Victoria Cross
Graduates of Addiscombe Military Seminary
British Indian Army generals
British East India Company Army officers
Knights Grand Cross of the Order of the Bath
Indian Rebellion of 1857 recipients of the Victoria Cross
People educated at Edinburgh Academy
British military personnel of the Abyssinian War
British military personnel of the Second Anglo-Afghan War
British Army lieutenant generals
Royal Artillery officers
Johnes
High Sheriffs of Carmarthenshire
Members of Carmarthenshire County Council